Boon Township is one of ten townships in Warrick County, Indiana, United States. As of the 2010 census, its population was 12,755 and it contained 5,529 housing units.

History
Boon Township was established in 1816 from land given by Anderson Township. It was named for settler Ratliff Boon.

Geography

Cities, towns, villages
 Boonville (the county seat)
 Chandler (east edge)

Unincorporated towns
 Bullocktown at 
 Center at 
 New Hope at 
 Pelzer at 
 Rolling Acres at 
(This list is based on USGS data and may include former settlements.)

Adjacent townships
 Hart Township (north)
 Owen Township (northeast)
 Grass Township, Spencer County (east)
 Skelton Township (east)
 Luce Township, Spencer County (southeast)
 Anderson Township (south)
 Campbell Township (west)
 Ohio Township (west)

Cemeteries
The township contains these cemeteries: Baker, Broshears, Brown Chapel, Clutter Stone, Ellis, Freedom (also known as Mundy Cemetery and  Powers Cemetery), Hedge, Maple Grove, Perigo, Plainview Memorial, Small, Thornburg, Warren and Wesley Chapel.

Airports and landing strips
 Boonville Airport

Landmarks
 Scales Lake State Park

School districts
 Warrick County School Corporation

Political districts
 Indiana's 8th congressional district
 State House District 74
 State Senate District 47

References
 
 United States Census Bureau 2007 TIGER/Line Shapefiles
 IndianaMap

External links
 Indiana Township Association
 United Township Association of Indiana
 Boonville youth sports website

Townships in Warrick County, Indiana
Townships in Indiana